Barbican Heights is a subdivision in the city of St. Catharines, Ontario, Canada. The community is bordered on the west by the 406, on the east by a small wooded area, on the north by the 406, and on the south by St. David's Road.
This neighbourhood is composed of low density residential properties, and a single park (Barbican Heights Park).

A Neutral Village was located here between 1615 and 1630. This village was probably the local capital for the Onguiarahronnon nation; containing around 25 long houses, with a population of about 1200.

References

Neighbourhoods in St. Catharines